The Peru national beach soccer team represents Peru in international beach soccer competitions and is controlled by the FPF, the governing body for football in Peru.

Current squad
Correct as of March 2018

 

Coach: Chicao (Francisco Franco de Almedia Castelo Branco)

Records

Achievements

FIFA Beach Soccer World Cup Best: Runners-up
2000
Mundialito de Futebol de Praia Best: Runners-up
1998

Beach Soccer World Cup

BSWW World Ranking= 39 (Results as 21 November 2008)

External links
 BSWW Profile

References 

    

South American national beach soccer teams
B
Football in Peru